Enzo Daniel Cabrera (born 20 November 1999) is an Argentine professional footballer who plays as a forward for Maltese side Birkirkara, on loan from Newell's Old Boys.

Career

Club
Cabrera's career started with Newell's Old Boys. Juan Manuel Llop was the manager who promoted him into the club's first-team squad, selecting him in fixtures throughout the 2017–18 Argentine Primera División. His professional debut arrived on 16 September 2017, he was substituted on for the final twenty-seven minutes with the scoreline goalless; the match eventually ended in a 2–0 win, with Cabrera assisting both goals. Cabrera's first start came less than a month later versus Godoy Cruz, which was one of a total fourteen appearances for Newell's Old Boys in 2017–18.

In July 2021, Cabrera joined Spanish Segunda División RFEF club CF Intercity on a one-year loan deal. After returning from the spell in Spain, Cabrera signed a new loan deal on 5 August 2022 with Maltese side Birkirkara for one year.

International
Cabrera has previously been selected to train with both the Argentina U20s and the senior team.

Career statistics
.

References

External links

1999 births
Living people
Argentine footballers
Argentine expatriate footballers
People from Casilda
Association football forwards
Sportspeople from Santa Fe Province
Argentine Primera División players
Segunda Federación players
Maltese Premier League players
Newell's Old Boys footballers
CF Intercity players
Birkirkara F.C. players
Argentine expatriate sportspeople in Spain
Argentine expatriate sportspeople in Malta
Expatriate footballers in Spain
Expatriate footballers in Malta